Joseph Constant (born Joseph Constantinovsky, 14 July 1892 – 3 October 1969) was a Franco-Russian sculptor, painter and writer of Jewish origin. As a sculptor, he adopted the name "Joseph Constant", as a writer he used the pseudonym "Michel Matveev".

Biography

Constant was born in Jaffa on 14 July 1892 to Russian Jewish parents. He spent his early years in Odessa. When still quite young, he took part alongside his father in the anti-Tsarist revolutionary activities of 1905. In 1914, he entered the Academy of Fine Arts in Odessa, and during the Communist Revolution of 1917 he was named an inspector of fine arts.

In 1919, his father and his brother were killed in an anti-Jewish pogrom. That same year, Constant and his wife decided to quit Russia. They travelled to Palestine aboard the ship Ruslan which carried a number of other Jewish artists. In Tel Aviv, they formed an artists' cooperative that included the painter Yitzhak Frenkel. A year later, the ailing Constant travelled to Egypt. He arrived in Paris in 1923 after further travels in Turkey and Romania.

In Paris, Constant frequented the district of Montparnasse, a favorite milieu of Russian Jewish artists. This served as the inspiration for his later novel La cité des peintres. Adopting the pseudonym of Michel Matveev, Constant was a late arrival to the literary scene. In his own words, it happened "un peu par hasard et pour gagner quelque argent" (a little bit by chance and to earn a little money). It was not until he arrived in France that he began to write, and he did so directly in French.

His first book, on the subject of the 1905 Revolution, was published in 1928. In the 1930s, he gradually abandoned the medium of painting, focusing instead on sculpture. He also continued his activity as a writer and translator. In 1933, he published Les Traqués, a tragic story of Jews travelling across Europe in search of a safe haven. This was translated into English by Desmond Flower under the title Weep Not for the Dead. In 1936, he won the Prix des Deux Magots for his collection of short stories Étrange famille (Strange family).

After the second world war, he gained greater renown as a sculptor both in France and abroad. From the 1950s onwards, he travelled frequently to Israel, staying at the kibbutz of Ein Harod. In 1962, the mayor of Ramat Gan invited him to take up residence in the artists' quarter in the heart of the city. From then on, Constant shared his time between his studio in Paris and that in Ramat Gan. The latter was converted into a museum upon his death.

In 1959, he wrote his last novel Ailleurs, autrefois, a semi-autobiographical work in which he evoked his childhood and youth in the Ukraine at the turn of the century. He died on 3 October 1969, in Paris.

Selected writings
1933: Les Traqués, éditions Gallimard
1936: Étrange Famille, éditions Gallimard; Prix des Deux Magots
1947: La Cité des peintres, éditions Atlas
1959: Ailleurs autrefois, éditions Gallimard

References

External links
 "Le Son de l'Est de Michel Matveev" by Raffaele Zanotti (in French)

Russian Jews
Russian emigrants to France
Russian writers
People from Jaffa
1892 births
1969 deaths
Prix des Deux Magots winners
20th-century French sculptors
French male sculptors
French male writers
20th-century French male writers